Developmental coordination disorder (DCD), also known as developmental motor coordination disorder, developmental dyspraxia or simply dyspraxia from the word 'praxis' meaning to do or act, is a neurodevelopmental disorder characterized by impaired coordination of physical movements as a result of brain messages not being accurately transmitted to the body. Deficits in fine or gross motor skills movements  interfere with activities of daily living. It is often described as disorder in skill acquisition, where the learning and execution of coordinated motor skills is substantially below that expected given the individual's chronological age. Difficulties may present as clumsiness, slowness and inaccuracy of performance of motor skills (e.g., catching objects, using cutlery, handwriting, riding a bike, use of tools or participating in team sports or swimming). It is also often accompanied by difficulty with organisation and/or problems with attention, working memory and time management.

A diagnosis of DCD is reached only in the absence of other neurological impairments such as cerebral palsy, multiple sclerosis, or Parkinson's disease. Onset of the condition is in early childhood and is lifelong. It is thought to affect about 5% of the population.

Signs and symptoms 

The World Health Organisation (WHO) recognise DCD as a condition, and have published  their definition in the International Classification of Diseases. This describes DCD as:

The American Psychiatric Association (APA)'s Diagnostic and Statistical Manual, DSM-5 classifies Developmental Coordination Disorder (DCD) as a discrete motor disorder under the broader heading of neurodevelopmental disorders. It is often described as a disorder in skill acquisition or motor learning, where the learning and execution of coordinated motor skills is substantially below that expected given the individual's chronological age. Various areas of development can be affected by DCD and these may persist into adulthood.

In children, DCD may exhibit as delays in early development of sitting, crawling, walking; poor ability or difficulties with childhood activities such as running, jumping, hopping, catching, sports and swimming; slowness; frequent tripping and bruising; poor handwriting skills; difficulties with self care; difficulties with skills such as using cutlery or tying shoelaces; poor spatial understanding; difficulty following instructions; poor time management; and often losing objects.

In adulthood, in addition to a childhood history as above, the condition may manifest as a difficulty learning new motor skills or applying skills in a different or busy environment, poor organisation and time management skills, missed deadlines and lateness for appointments (or earliness as a coping strategy), and awkward pauses before answering in conversation. There is often a history of underachievement in education or the workplace. Although skills can be acquired, such as neat handwriting, handwriting speed will then be much lower than expected.

Evidence from research and clinical practice indicates that DCD is not just a physical disorder, and there may be deficits in executive functions, behavioural organisation and emotional regulation that extend beyond the motor impairments and which are independent of diagnoses of co-morbidities. In addition to the physical or motor impairments, developmental coordination disorder is associated with problems with memory, especially working memory. This typically results in difficulty remembering instructions, difficulty organizing one's time and remembering deadlines, increased propensity to lose things or problems carrying out tasks which require remembering several steps in sequence (such as cooking). Whilst most of the general population experience these problems to some extent, they have a much more significant impact on the lives of dyspraxic people. However, many dyspraxics have excellent long-term memories, despite poor short-term memory. Many dyspraxics benefit from working in a structured environment, as repeating the same routine minimises difficulty with time-management and allows them to commit procedures to long-term memory.

People with developmental coordination disorder sometimes have difficulty moderating the amount of sensory information that their body is constantly sending them, so as a result these dyspraxics may be prone to sensory overload and panic attacks.

Moderate to extreme difficulty doing physical tasks is experienced by some people with dyspraxia, and fatigue is common because so much energy is expended trying to execute physical movements correctly. Some dyspraxics have hypotonia, low muscle tone, which can also detrimentally affect balance.

Gross motor control 
Whole body movement and motor coordination issues mean that major developmental targets including walking, running, climbing and jumping can be affected. The difficulties vary from person to person and can include the following:

 Poor timing.
 Poor balance (sometimes even falling over in mid-step). Tripping over one's own feet is also common.
 Difficulty combining movements into a controlled sequence.
 Difficulty remembering the next movement in a sequence.
 Problems with spatial awareness, or proprioception.
 Trouble picking up and holding onto simple objects such as pencils, owing to poor muscle tone or proprioception.
 Clumsiness to the point of knocking things over, causing minor injuries to oneself and bumping into people accidentally.
 Difficulty in determining left from right.
 Cross-laterality, ambidexterity, and a shift in the preferred hand are also common in people with developmental coordination disorder.
 Problems with chewing foods.

Fine motor control 
Fine-motor problems can cause difficulty with a wide variety of other tasks such as using a knife and fork, fastening buttons and shoelaces, cooking, brushing teeth, styling hair, shaving, applying cosmetics, opening jars and packets, locking and unlocking doors, and doing housework.

Difficulties with fine motor co-ordination lead to problems with handwriting,
Problems associated with this area may include:

 Learning basic movement patterns.
 Developing a desired writing speed.
 Establishing the correct pencil grip.
 Handwriting that is difficult to read and may miss words in sentences or place words in the incorrect order
 The acquisition of graphemes – e.g. the letters of the Latin alphabet, as well as numbers.

Developmental verbal dyspraxia 
Developmental verbal dyspraxia (DVD) is a type of ideational dyspraxia, causing speech and language impairments. This is the favoured term in the UK; however, it is also sometimes referred to as articulatory dyspraxia, and in the United States the usual term is childhood apraxia of speech (CAS).

Key problems include:

 Difficulties controlling the speech organs.
 Difficulties making speech sounds.
 Difficulty sequencing sounds within a word, and
 Difficulty sequencing sounds forming words into sentences.
 Difficulty controlling breathing, suppressing salivation and phonation when talking or singing with lyrics.
 Slow language development.

Associated disorders and secondary consequences 
People who have developmental coordination disorder may also have one or more of these co-morbid conditions:

 Attention deficit hyperactivity disorder (ADHD) (inattention, hyperactivity, impulsive behaviour).
 Fetal Alcohol Spectrum Disorder
 A condition on the autism spectrum.
 Dyscalculia (difficulty with numbers). 
 Dysgraphia (an inability to write neatly or draw).
 Dyslexia (difficulty with reading and spelling).
 Hypotonia (low muscle tone).
 Nonverbal learning disorder.
 Sensory processing disorder.
 Developmental Language Disorder (DLD).
 Visual perception deficits.

However, a person with DCD is unlikely to have all of these conditions. The pattern of difficulty varies widely from person to person; an area of major weakness for one dyspraxic can be an area of strength or gift for another. For example, while some dyspraxics have difficulty with reading and spelling due to dyslexia, or with numeracy due to dyscalculia, others may have brilliant reading and spelling or mathematical abilities. Co-morbidity between ADHD and DCD is particularly high; the overlap between the two disorders is believed to be about 50% (approximately half of people with DCD have ADHD).

Sensory processing disorder 

Sensory processing disorder (SPD) concerns having oversensitivity or undersensitivity to physical stimuli, such as touch, light, sound, and smell. This may manifest itself as an inability to tolerate certain textures such as sandpaper or certain fabrics such as wool, oral intolerance of excessively textured food (commonly known as picky eating), being touched by another individual (in the case of touch oversensitivity) or it may require the consistent use of sunglasses outdoors since sunlight may be intense enough to cause discomfort to a dyspraxic person (in the case of light oversensitivity). An aversion to loud music and naturally loud environments (such as clubs and bars) is typical behavior of individuals with dyspraxia who have auditory oversensitivity, while only being comfortable in unusually warm or cold environments is typical of a dyspraxic with temperature oversensitivity. Undersensitivity to stimuli may also cause problems, as individuals do not receive the sensory input they need to understand where their bodies are in space. This can make it even more challenging to complete tasks. Dyspraxics who are undersensitive to pain may injure themselves without realising it. Some dyspraxics may be oversensitive to some stimuli and undersensitive to others.

Developmental Language Disorder 

Developmental Language Disorder (DLD) research has found that students with developmental coordination disorder and normal language skills still experience learning difficulties despite relative strengths in language. This means that, for students with developmental coordination disorder, their working memory abilities determine their learning difficulties. Any strength in language that they have is not able to sufficiently support their learning.

Students with developmental coordination disorder struggle most in visual-spatial memory. When compared to their peers without motor difficulties, students with developmental coordination disorder are seven times more likely than typically developing students to achieve very poor scores in visual-spatial memory. As a result of this working memory impairment, students with developmental coordination disorder have learning deficits as well.

Psychological and social consequences 
Psychological domain: Children with DCD may struggle with lower self-efficacy and lower self-perceived competence in peer and social relations. Some demonstrate greater aggressiveness and hyperactivity.

Social domain: Children may be more vulnerable to social rejection and bullying, possibly resulting in higher levels of loneliness.

Diagnosis 

Assessments for developmental coordination disorder typically require a developmental history, detailing ages at which significant developmental milestones, such as crawling and walking, occurred. Motor skills screening includes activities designed to indicate developmental coordination disorder, including balancing, physical sequencing, touch sensitivity, and variations on walking activities.

The American Psychiatric Association has four primary inclusive diagnostic criteria for determining if a child has developmental coordination disorder.

The criteria are as follows:
 Motor coordination will be greatly reduced, although the intelligence of the child is normal for the age.
 The difficulties the child experiences with motor coordination or planning interfere with the child's daily life.
 The difficulties with coordination are not due to any other medical condition
 If the child does also experience comorbidities such as intellectual or other developmental disability; motor coordination is still disproportionally affected.

Screening tests 
Currently there is no single "gold standard" assessment test for DCD. Various screening tests may be used, including the following.

{| class="wikitable" style="width:90%; border:solid 1px #999999; margin:0 0 1em 1em;" 
|-
!Screening tests that can be used to assess developmental coordination disorder
|-
|
 Movement Assessment Battery for Children (Movement-ABC – Movement-ABC 2)
 Peabody Developmental Motor Scales- Second Edition (PDMS-2)
 Bruininks-Oseretsky Test of Motor Proficiency (BOTMP-BOT-2)
 Motoriktest für vier- bis sechsjährige Kinder (MOT 4–6)
 Körperkoordinationtest für Kinder (KTK)
 Test of Gross Motor Development, Second Edition (TGMD-2)
 Maastrichtse Motoriek Test (MMT)
 Wechsler Adult Intelligence Scale (WAIS-III and WAIS-IV)
 Wechsler Individual Achievement Test (WAIT-II)
 Test Of Word Reading Efficiency Second Edition (TOWRE-2)
 Developmental Coordination Disorder Questionnaire (DCD-Q). The DCD-Q has been translated into many languages. For French-speaking populations, a Canadian-French version  and a European-French version are available.
 Children's Self-Perceptions of Adequacy in, and Predilection for Physical Activity (CSAPPA)
|}

A baseline motor assessment establishes the starting point for developmental intervention programs. Comparing children to normal rates of development may help to establish areas of significant difficulty.

However, research in the British Journal of Special Education has shown that knowledge is severely limited in many who should be trained to recognise and respond to various difficulties, including developmental coordination disorder, dyslexia and deficits in attention, motor control and perception (DAMP). The earlier that difficulties are noted and timely assessments occur, the quicker intervention can begin. A teacher or GP could miss a diagnosis if they are only applying a cursory knowledge.

A diagnosis of DCD is reached only in the absence of other neurological impairments such as cerebral palsy, multiple sclerosis, or Parkinson's disease.

Classification 
Developmental coordination disorder is classified in the fifth revision of the Diagnostic and Statistical Manual of Mental Disorders (DSM-5) as a motor disorder, in the category of neurodevelopmental disorders.

Prevalence 
The exact proportion of people with the disorder is unknown since the disorder can be difficult to detect due to a lack of specific laboratory tests, thus making diagnosis of the condition one of elimination of all other possible causes/diseases. Approximately 5–6% of children and adults are affected by this condition. and approximately 2% are severely affected.

DCD is a lifelong neurological condition that is expected to be as common in males as it is in females. Currently however, the diagnosis criteria favours males which results in over 80% of males being diagnosed before the age of 16 compared to only 22% for females.

Management
There is no cure for the condition. Instead, it is managed through therapy. Physical therapy or occupational therapy can help those living with the condition.

Some people with the condition find it helpful to find alternative ways of carrying out tasks or organizing themselves, such as typing on a laptop instead of writing by hand, or using diaries and calendars to keep organized. A review completed in 2017 by Cochrane of task-oriented interventions for DCD resulted in inconsistent findings and a call for further research and randomized controlled trials.

Co-occurring conditions 

DCD is known to co-occur with other neurodevelopmental disorders. Most commonly, Attention Deficit Hyperactivity Disorder (ADHD) co-occurs in an estimated 50% of cases, but other co-occurring conditions are Autistic Spectrum Disorder (ASD), Developmental Speech and Language Disorder and Developmental Learning Disorder.

History 
Collier first described developmental coordination disorder as "congenital maladroitness". A. Jean Ayres referred to developmental coordination disorder as a disorder of sensory integration in 1972, while in 1975 Sasson Gubbay, MD, called it the "clumsy child syndrome". Developmental coordination disorder has also been called "minimal brain dysfunction", although the two latter names are no longer in use.

Other names include developmental apraxia, disorder of attention and motor perception (DAMP) dyspraxia, developmental dyspraxia, "motor learning difficulties", perceptuo-motor dysfunction, and sensorimotor dysfunction.

The World Health Organization currently lists developmental coordination disorder as "Specific Developmental Disorder of Motor Function".

In popular culture

Fictional characters 
 Helen Burns, a character from Charlotte Brontë's Jane Eyre, is alleged to have been based on the author's dyspraxic elder sister Maria Brontë.
 Ryan Sinclair, a companion of the Doctor in the BBC science fiction television programme Doctor Who, has the disorder. The character debuted in 2018.

Public figures
People who have publicly stated they have been diagnosed with developmental coordination disorder include:

 actor Daniel Radcliffe,
 photographer David Bailey,
 model Cara Delevingne, 
 singer Florence Welch, 
 politician Emma Lewell-Buck,
 Rugby Union player Ellis Genge, 
 actor Will Poulter, 
 singer Mel B, 
 actor Olive Gray, 
 author Holly Smale, 
 games critic John "TotalBiscuit" Bain, 
 musician Toyah Willcox  
 comedian Harriet Kemsley.

See also 

 Asperger syndrome
 Nonverbal learning disorder
 Autism spectrum
 Aging movement control
 Apraxia
 Deficits in attention, motor control and perception
 KE family
 Lists of language disorders
 Motor coordination
 Motor control
 Multisensory integration
 Sensory-motor coupling
 Working memory
 Fetal alcohol spectrum disorders

References

Sources

Further reading 

 
 
 

Motor control
Neurological disorders
Neurological disorders in children
Special education
Specific developmental disorders